was a  after Tenpyō and before Tenpyō-shōhō. This period spanned mere months, April through July 749.

Change of era
 749 : The new era name Tenpyō-kanpō is not found in some chronologies because its duration was so limited—a period of four months during the last year of Shōmu's reign. The previous era ended and this new one commenced in Tenpyō 21, on the 14th day of the 4th month of 749. At some point shortly thereafter, the emperor determined to abdicate. Shōmu became the first emperor who renounced his throne to take the tonsure as a Buddhist monk. His wife, Empress Kōmyō, followed her husband's example by entering holy orders as well. Shōmu's reign and this era ended simultaneously. Also at this same time, the former-Emperor Shōmu began a new phase of his life and Shōmu's daughter began her reign.

Events of the Tenpyō-kanpō era
 749 (Tenpyō-kanpō 1, 2nd day of the 7th month): In the 25th year of Shōmu-tennōs reign (聖武天皇25年), the emperor abdicated; and the succession (senso) was received by his daughter. Shortly thereafter, Empress Kōken is said to have acceded to the throne (sokui).
 749 (Tenpyō-kanpō 1, 2nd day of the 7th month): To mark Empress Kōken's enthronement, the truncated Tenpyō-kanpō era is superseded by the new Tenpyō-Shōhō era.

Notes

References
 Brown, Delmer M. and Ichirō Ishida, eds. (1979).  Gukanshō: The Future and the Past. Berkeley: University of California Press. ;  OCLC 251325323
 Nussbaum, Louis-Frédéric and Käthe Roth. (2005).  Japan encyclopedia. Cambridge: Harvard University Press. ;  OCLC 58053128
 Titsingh, Isaac. (1834). Nihon Ōdai Ichiran; ou,  Annales des empereurs du Japon.  Paris: Royal Asiatic Society, Oriental Translation Fund of Great Britain and Ireland. OCLC 5850691
 Varley, H. Paul. (1980). A Chronicle of Gods and Sovereigns: Jinnō Shōtōki of Kitabatake Chikafusa. New York: Columbia University Press. ;  OCLC 6042764

External links
 National Diet Library, "The Japanese Calendar" -- historical overview plus illustrative images from library's collection

Japanese eras
8th century in Japan
749